Puntone di Scarlino is a village in Tuscany, central Italy, administratively a frazione of the comune of Scarlino, province of Grosseto. At the time of the 2001 census its population amounted to 345.

Puntone is about 41 km from Grosseto and 8 km from Scarlino, and it is situated on the Gulf of Follonica, in the Tyrrhenian Sea. It is a tourist resort with a well-equipped marina.

Main sights 
 Portus Scabris Archaeological Museum, full of Roman artefacts found during the construction of the port.
 Chapel of Puntone, little church that is part of the parish of Pian d'Alma.
 Former church of San Severo a Portiglioni, it is attested in a document of 1104 and its ruins lie next to the village.
 Tower of Portiglioni, old coastal tower, now reduced to rubble.
 Roman villa of Puntone Vecchio, ruins of a building of 1st century BC.

References

Bibliography 
 Giuseppe Guerrini, Torri e castelli della Provincia di Grosseto, Nuova Immagine Editrice, Siena, 1999.
 Aldo Mazzolai, Guida della Maremma. Percorsi tra arte e natura, Le Lettere, Florence, 1997.

See also 
 Pian d'Alma
 Scarlino
 Scarlino Scalo

Frazioni of Scarlino